Norman Park can refer to:

Australia 

 Norman Park, Queensland, a suburb of Brisbane

United Kingdom 

 Norman Park, Bromley, a recreation ground near Hayes, Bromley

United States 

Norman Park, Georgia,  a city in Colquitt County